Freedom Summer was a 1964 voter registration project in the U.S. state of Mississippi. It may also refer to: 

 Freedom Summer (book), a 2001 children's book written by Deborah Wiles and illustrated by Jerome Lagarrigue
 Freedom Summer (film), a 2014 American documentary film by Stanley Nelson Jr
 Freedom Summer murders, the murders of Chaney, Goodman, and Schwerner in the U.S. state of Mississippi in 1964